Asialoglycoprotein receptor 1 is a protein that in humans is encoded by the ASGR1 gene.

Function

This gene encodes a subunit of the asialoglycoprotein receptor. This receptor is a transmembrane protein that plays a critical role in serum glycoprotein homeostasis by mediating the endocytosis and lysosomal degradation of glycoproteins with exposed terminal galactose or N-acetylgalactosamine residues. The asialoglycoprotein receptor may facilitate hepatic infection by multiple viruses including hepatitis B, and is also a target for liver-specific drug delivery. The asialoglycoprotein receptor is a hetero-oligomeric protein composed of major and minor subunits, which are encoded by different genes. The protein encoded by this gene is the more abundant major subunit. Alternatively spliced transcript variants encoding multiple isoforms have been observed for this gene.

References

Further reading